Maroc Soir Group is a pro-government publishing company based in Casablanca, Morocco.

Profile
The group is the oldest media company in Morocco. It was founded during the French protectorate-era as "Mas presse" by Pierre Mas and Yves Mas. Moulay Ahmed Alaoui was founder of the group. It edited the publication Le Petit Marocain which promoted the colonial policies of France in Morocco and defended its interests. It also supported the Vichy government and was reprimanded for that after 1945.

On 1 November 1971, during the Moroccanization, the company was expropriated and re-branded as Maroc Soir, editing Le Matin and Maroc Soir. In 2001, the group was acquired by Othman Benjelloun and sold again in March 2004 to its current Saudi owner, businessman Othman Al Omeir, a former editor-in-chief of Asharq Alawsat and current owner of Elaph. He acquired the group for $16 million.

Newspapers
The Group owns the following papers: 
 Assahra Al Maghribiya 
 Le Matin
 Maroc Soir
 La Mañana – Weekly
 Defunct Morocco Times – in

See also
Ecomedias media group partly owned by the firm SNI editing Assabah and L'Économiste

References

Mass media companies of Morocco
Mass media in Casablanca
Companies based in Casablanca